Spectrum 10K is a paused study of autistic people intended to be the largest of its kind in the United Kingdom. The name refers to the autism spectrum and the putative number of subjects. Led by Simon Baron-Cohen under the aegis of the Autism Research Centre (ARC), the study (an outgrowth of the defunct Human Genome Project) included researchers at the University of Cambridge, the Wellcome Sanger Institute, and the University of California at Los Angeles (UCLA). Participants (including adults and minors with parental consent) were asked to contribute their DNA samples via swabs of saliva, as well as information on their overall mental and physical health. Overall, 10,000 autistic people and their families were to be involved in the study, which aimed to study genetic and environmental factors contributing to autism and co-occurring conditions.

Reaction
The project, which is anticipated to run for a decade, was controversial from the outset. Even before the project began, Baron-Cohen had been criticised by some autistic people due to his "extreme male brain" theory of autism, which argues that autistic people lack empathy. Additionally, many in the autism rights movement have criticised the lack of consultation with autistic people or their families, and raised privacy, scientific ethics and eugenics concerns due to fears of sharing genetic data. This led to the formation of the autistic-led Boycott Spectrum 10K group and hashtag, as well as a Change.org petition against the project. As a result of the backlash, the project was paused on 27 September 2021. However, autistic self-advocacy groups have continued to picket centres involved in the project.

As a result of the protest, a second ethics review was conducted. The second ethics review found that the first ethics review was correctly decided and that the study should continue.

References

External links
 Spectrum 10K – The largest study of autism in the UK Official website

 

Autism
Communication disorders
Neurological disorders in children